Farnsworth's vine snake (Ahaetulla farnsworthi) is a species of tree snake endemic to the central Western Ghats of India.

Taxonomy 
It was formerly considered conspecific with A. nasuta, which is now considered to only be endemic to Sri Lanka. A 2020 study found A. nasuta to be a species complex of A. nasuta sensu stricto as well as A. borealis, A. farnsworthi, A. isabellina, and A. malabarica. The species is named after the character Professor Farnsworth from the American animated television series Futurama, as a reference to the character's efforts in resurrecting barking snakes from extinction.

Geographic range 
This species is endemic to the state of Karnataka, where it is distributed from Coorg to the Agumbe-Kodachadri range. It may be sympatric with A. malabarica in Coorg, but is largely separated from the species by rivers. Near the northern edge of its range it is flanked by A. borealis, from which it is likely separated by the Sharavathi River basin.

Habitat 
The species is found in mid-elevation tropical rainforests in the Western Ghats from 500 to 850 msl.

References 

Ahaetulla
Reptiles of India
Snakes of Asia
Fauna of Karnataka
Endemic fauna of the Western Ghats
Reptiles described in 2020